Justin Kerr-Smiley (born  25 April 1965) is a writer and journalist who lives in London, England.

Education
Kerr-Smiley was educated at Ampleforth College and Newcastle University and completed post graduate studies in broadcast journalism in 1990. As a correspondent Kerr-Smiley has reported from Northern Ireland, the Balkans and South America. He is a member of the Society of Authors and was awarded a travel scholarship in 2011. He is also a published poet.

Career
Under The Sun was first published in 2007. The novel is set in the South Pacific during the closing stages of World War II. It is the story of the relationship between an RAF pilot who is shot down and taken prisoner, and the Japanese officer in charge of him. The Sunday Telegraph described it as "a small masterpiece; the best novel that I have read about war since Captain Corelli's Mandolin." Under The Sun is now published by Arcadia Books.

References

Interviews 
Review and interview in The Daily Telegraph
An interview by Paul Vlitos

External links 
Justin Kerr-Smiley's Website
Arcadia Books
The Japan Society

1965 births
British male journalists
British writers
Associated Press reporters
Living people
Writers from London
Journalists from London
People from London
21st-century English male writers
21st-century British journalists
21st-century British writers
Alumni of Newcastle University
People educated at Ampleforth College